Lorenzo Cittadini (born 17 December 1982) is a retired Italian rugby union player who plays at prop. He made his debut for Italy against Ireland on 2 February 2008. He played at the 2011 Rugby World Cup in New Zealand and the 2015 Rugby World Cup in England.He represented Italy on 58 occasions. 

On 22 April 2014, Cittadini moved to England to join Wasps in the Aviva Premiership from the 2014-15 season. On 30 June 2016, Cittadini makes move to France with Bayonne in the Top 14 from the 2016-17 season.

Honours
National Championship of Excellence
Champions Calvisano: 2007–08
Champions Benetton Treviso: 2009–10
Coppa Italia
Champions Benetton Treviso: 2009–10

References

External links
Rugby Calvisano Profile

1982 births
Living people
Sportspeople from Bergamo
Benetton Rugby players
Wasps RFC players
Italian rugby union players
Rugby union props
Italy international rugby union players
Italian expatriate rugby union players
Italian expatriate sportspeople in England
Expatriate rugby union players in England